P. C. Vishnunadh (born 30 March 1978) is an Indian politician of the Indian National Congress, who represents Kundara constituency in the Kerala Legislative Assembly.

Biography
P. C. Vishnunadh was born to P. Chellappan Pillai and Leela C. Pillai at Mavadi in Kottarakara of Kollam district. Vishnunadh is married to Kanaka Ha Ma.

Political career
P. C. Vishnunadh entered politics through Kerala Students Union (K.S.U.) and was Unit Secretary of Devaswom Board College, Sasthamkotta (1993). He was elected as the secretary, Arts Club, Devaswom Board College (1997) and University Union Councillor, Devaswom Board College (1998). P. C. Vishnunadh was elected to the Kerala University Senate in 2001 and 2002. He had participated in 'Memorial March' in 2005 commemorating the 75th anniversary of the Dandi March as the representative of Kerala State. He was state President of Kerala Students' Union (K.S.U.(I)) from 2002 to 2006. During his period with K.S.U, he was imprisoned in connection with the Strike conducted by K.S.U. against hike in bus charge. He has participated in many students' agitation and strikes. He was elected as Kerala Youth Congress President in 2010. In 2014 he was nominated as the KPCC general secretary. In 2017, he was appointed the Secretary of Indian National Congress with charge of Karnataka state. In 2020 January, he was appointed the Vice President of Kerala Pradesh Congress Committee.

P. C. Vishnunadh was first elected to Kerala Legislative Assembly from Chengannur assembly constituency in 2006 Kerala Legislative Assembly election by defeating Mr. Saji Cheriyan of CPI(M) by a margin of 9531 votes. He was re-elected for the second time in 2011 Kerala Legislative Assembly election defeating Adv. C. S. Sujatha of CPI(M) by a margin of 12500 votes. In 2016 Kerala Legislative Assembly election he was defeated by Adv K. K. Ramachandran Nair of CPI(M) by a margin of 7983 votes. He had contested the 2021 Kerala Legislative Assembly election from Kundara assembly constituency and defeated J. Mercykutty Amma of Left Democratic Front (Kerala) by 9,523 votes.

Other interests
P.C Vishnunadh has sung a song in a short film named "Njan Kanda Keralam" directed by his friend Ramesh Makayiram.

References

External links
 Official Website of P.C Vishnunadh

Living people
Indian National Congress politicians from Kerala
1978 births
People from Alappuzha district
Politicians from Thiruvananthapuram
Kerala MLAs 2011–2016
Government Law College, Thiruvananthapuram alumni